Nien-Ting Wu (born June 7, 1993) is a Taiwanese professional baseball player. He is an infielder for the Saitama Seibu Lions of Nippon Professional Baseball (NPB). He was selected to play for the Chinese Taipei national baseball team in the 2023 World Baseball Classic.

References

External links

1993 births
Living people
Nippon Professional Baseball infielders
Saitama Seibu Lions players
Baseball players from Taipei
2023 World Baseball Classic players
Taiwanese expatriate baseball players in Japan